KBYO-FM (92.7 FM) is an American radio station broadcasting a Christian hip hop music format. Licensed to serve the community of Farmerville, Louisiana, the station broadcasts to the greater Monroe area. The station is currently owned by Media Ministries, Inc.

After the departure of talk show hosts Dean Edell and Laura Schlessinger from terrestrial radio at the end of 2010, KBYO announced it would be changing to a music format known as "Fun Radio 92.7" in January 2011.

On August 14, 2014, following a brief period off air while being sold to Media Ministries, KBYO flipped to a Christian Hip-Hop/R&B format as Power 92.7.

References

External links

Mass media in Monroe, Louisiana
Contemporary Christian radio stations in the United States
Christian radio stations in Louisiana